Tamchi may refer to:
 Tamchy, Kyrgyzstan
 Tamachi, Iran